Tiyin (Cyrillic "тийин")  is a unit of currency of Uzbekistan, equal to  of a soum. The tiyin was also the name of a subunit of the Kazakhstani tenge until 1995.

The Uzbek tiyin is the world's lowest value coin that was still legal tender until March 1st 2020, although in practice it was rarely found in circulation.

References

Economy of Uzbekistan
One-cent coins